Crescent Spire is a peak in the Purcell Mountains of the Columbia Mountains in southeastern British Columbia, Canada. Crescent Spire was named in 1933 by James Monroe Thorington because he was impressed with its shape.

Routes 
West Ridge 5.4 / 180m
WIMTA 5.10- / 5 pitches
Clean and Dirty 5.10 / 6 pitches
Paddle Flake Direct 5.10 / 6 pitches
Paddle Flake 5.10 / 6 pitches
Left Dihedral 5.11 / 6 pitches
Westside Story 5.11 / 6 pitches
Roof McTech 5.10+ / 2 pitches
Energy Crisis 5.11+ / 2 pitches 
McTech Arete 5.10- / 6 pitches
Mc Tech Direct 5.10 / 6 pitches
Woza Moya / 5.10- / 6 pitches
Dunlop's Dangle 5.10- / 6 pitches
Surprisingly Subsevere 5.10 / 6 pitches
Northeast Ridge 5.6 / 300m

References

Two-thousanders of British Columbia
Columbia Valley
Purcell Mountains